Defensor La Bocana is a Peruvian football club, playing in the city of Sechura, Piura, Peru.

History
In the 2013 Copa Perú, the club classified to the Regional Stage, but was eliminated by Willy Serrato in the semifinals.

In the 2014 Copa Perú, the club classified to the National Stage, but was eliminated by Sport Loreto in the semifinals.

In the 2015 Copa Perú, the club classified to the National Stage and were made champions by defeating Cantolao 4-3 on aggregate. With the win, Defensor La Bocana qualified directly to the top flight of Peruvian football the Torneo Descentralizado in 2016.

Their first season in the Torneo Descentralizado was also their last to date. Defensor La Bocana finished 16th in the overall table and was relegated to the Peruvian Segunda División for 2017.

Honours

National
Copa Perú:
Winners (1): 2015

Regional
Región I:
Runner-up (1): 2014

Liga Departamental de Piura:
Winners (3): 2013, 2014, 2015
Runner-up (1): 2022

Liga Superior de Piura:
Winners (1): 2015

Liga Provincial de Sechura:
Winners (4): 2013, 2014, 2019, 2022
Runner-up (1): 2012

Liga Distrital de Sechura:
Winners (4): 2011, 2014, 2019, 2022
Runner-up (2): 2012, 2013

See also
List of football clubs in Peru
Peruvian football league system

References

External links
 Defensor La Bocana (Piura)

Football clubs in Peru
Association football clubs established in 1987